Teodora Gheorghiu (born 8 May 1978 in Brașov) is a Romanian soprano who has performed in opera, concert and recital across Europe.

Early life and training
Gheorghiu was born in Brașov, where she studied the flute before focussing on singing. She pursued vocal studies at the Academia de Muzică Gheorghe Dima in Cluj-Napoca and went on to participate in several competitions, including the Queen Elisabeth Music Competition and the Julián Gayarre International Singing Competition. Upon hearing Gheorghiu sing, the Spanish tenor José Carreras offered her a personal scholarship to continue with her studies.

Career
Gheorghiu made her debut in 2003 at the Romanian National Opera, Bucharest, singing the role of the Queen of the Night in Mozart's Die Zauberflöte.

In 2007, Gheorghiu was engaged as a member of the ensemble of the Wiener Staatsoper, and continued to sing there regularly until 2010. Her roles in Vienna included Adele in Die Fledermaus, Nanetta in Falstaff, Fiakermilli in Arabella, Adina in L'elisir d'amore, Elvira in L'italiana in Algeri, Sophie in Werther and Eudoxie in La Juive.

Gheorghiu recorded her first album, Arias for Anna de Amicis, in 2011. Her second, of Lieder was released in 2012. Gheorghiu made her UK debut at Glyndebourne in 2014, singing the role of Sophie in Der Rosenkavalier.

References

Living people
1978 births
People from Brașov
Romanian operatic sopranos
21st-century Romanian singers
21st-century Romanian women singers
Prize-winners of the Queen Elisabeth Competition